This article lists the performances of each of the 60 national teams which have made at least one appearance in the Ice Hockey World Championships, an annual international men's ice hockey tournament organized by the International Ice Hockey Federation (IIHF), including the Olympic ice hockey tournament was also considered the World Championship for that year, and was held before the first Ice Hockey World Championship as an individual event in 1930. With the exception between 1940 and 1946, when no championships were held during World War II, nor were held during the Olympic years 1980, 1984, and 1988. In 2020, the IIHF announced that all World Championship tournaments have been cancelled due to the COVID-19 pandemic and travel restrictions-related issues.

Sweden has appeared in 80 out of 85 tournaments to date, with Canada, having participated in 75, and Finland in 68. The United States has appeared in 73 top division tournaments and five in lower divisions. Although the U.S. was unsuccessful at the 1969 World Championship, finished in last place in Group A (now Top Division) after losing all ten games. This marks the first time in Men's Worlds history, the United States was relegated to Group B (now Division I) until the 1970 World Championship, the U.S. bounce back and finished in first place in Group B (7th overall) after winning all seven games and was promoted back to Group A.

Finland is the current World Champion, defeating Canada in the gold medal game at the 2022 IIHF World Championship. Since the IIHF introduced a playoff system in 1992, Switzerland has appeared in two World Championship gold medal games, finished as the runners-up after losing to Sweden twice in 2013 and 2018. The United States is the only "Big Six" team to have never advanced past the World Championship semifinals and never appeared in every World Championship gold medal game.

Debut of teams
A total of 62 national teams have participated for at least one IIHF World Championship through the 2023 event, and at least two will debut in 2023. Each successive IIHF World Championships has had at least one team appearing for the first time, in alphabetical order per year. Teams in parentheses are considered successor teams by the IIHF.

Notes:
 Between 1920 and 1968, the Olympic ice hockey tournament was also considered the World Championship for that year.
 Each of the national teams have made their debut that participate in the lower division of the World Championship.

Key:
  – The Summer Olympic Games Ice Hockey Tournament held that year counted as the World Championship
  – The Winter Olympic Games Ice Hockey Tournament held that year counted as the World Championship

With 62 national teams to have participated through the 2023 event, the IIHF World Championships is the second most participated men's world championship, behind the FIFA World Cup (80), and ahead of the FIBA Basketball World Cup (60), the FIVB Volleyball Men's World Championship, the IHF World Men's Handball Championship (58), the Rugby World Cup (25), the Men's FIH Hockey World Cup (25), the World Baseball Classic (23), and the Cricket World Cup (20).

Ranking of teams by number of appearances

Breakdown of successor teams

Comprehensive team results by tournament

Results of host nations

Results of defending champions

Medal table
Nations in italics are no longer compete at the World Championships.

Droughts
This section is a list of droughts associated with the participation of men's national ice hockey teams in the IIHF World Championships, including Final appearance and World Champion droughts up to and including the 2022 IIHF World Championship. Those teams which have not participated in any World Championship are listed by the year that they entered the IIHF tournaments.

Note:
 Does not include droughts between 1940 and 1946, when no championships were held during World War II, nor were held during the Olympic years 1980, 1984, and 1988, and 2020 championships were cancelled due to the COVID-19 pandemic.

Longest active Final droughts
Does not include two teams that made the 2022 Final: Canada and Finland.

Longest all-time Final droughts
 Active Final drought is highlighted

Longest active Champion droughts
Does not include the most-recent World Champion: Finland.

Longest all-time Champion droughts
 Active Champion drought is highlighted

Longest active appearance droughts
Does not include teams that have not made their first appearance. Does not include droughts when all lower division tournaments were cancelled for two years (2020–2021) due to the COVID-19 pandemic.

Longest all-time appearance droughts
Only includes droughts begun after a team's first appearance and until the team ceased to exist. Updated to include participation for the 2023 World Championships.

 Active appearance drought is highlighted

Teams with no IIHF World Championship appearances
24 out of 83 current IIHF members have not entered in any World Championship tournaments.

* – IIHF associate member, ** – IIHF affiliate member

Notes

References

External links
 IIHF official website

IIHF World Championship records and statistics
Ice hockey-related lists